Tim Gudgin (25 November 1929 – 8 November 2017) was a British radio presenter and voiceover artist. He was best known for announcing the football results on the BBC sports programmes Grandstand and Final Score between 1995 and 2011. He read the results out for the last time on 19 November 2011, just a week before his 82nd birthday.

Education and early career
Gudgin was educated at the independent Whitgift School in South Croydon, London, but did not go to university. He carried out his National Service during the 1940s, and he started his broadcasting career during that time in Germany in 1949. After completing his National Service he started a long career at the BBC.

Grandstand and Final Score
Gudgin began working on Grandstand in 1965, initially announcing the rugby and racing results, but then succeeded Len Martin as the broadcaster of the football results after Martin's death in 1995. Gudgin was only the second person to perform the role regularly from the inception of Grandstand in 1958. After Grandstand ended in 2007, he continued to read the results on Final Score.

Match of the Day presenter Gary Lineker described Gudgin as "one of the most familiar voices in sport" and "a quintessential part of Saturday afternoons in this country".

Other work
Gudgin's voice was heard on the BBC Radio 4 quiz Quote... Unquote, Housewives' Choice, Top of the Form , Music Box and Friday Night is Music Night. Interviewed in November 2011, Gudgin said, "I did an in-vision commercial for Square Deal Surf which bought me the first house I ever had without a mortgage, so that was well worth it."

Personal life
Gudgin was a Crystal Palace supporter and lived in Emsworth, Hampshire.

Retirement
Gudgin announced just prior to reading the results on the 6 August 2011 that the 2011–12 season would be his last before retirement, with his last reading on 19 November 2011. He later cited several reasons for his retirement including his age, the distance he would have to travel following BBC Sport's relocation to Salford and his granddaughter's wedding in Australia which he wanted to attend. His successor on Final Score was Mike West, who was the presenter of sports bulletins on BBC Radio Lancashire.

Gudgin died on 8 November 2017, aged 87.

References

1929 births
2017 deaths
British radio presenters
British sports broadcasters
Radio and television announcers
BBC sports presenters and reporters
BBC Radio 2 presenters
People educated at Whitgift School
People from Emsworth